Saint-Florent-le-Vieil is a former commune in the Maine-et-Loire department in western France. On 15 December 2015, it was merged into the new commune Mauges-sur-Loire. Its population was 2,834 in 2019.

The river Èvre forms the commune's western border, then flows into the Loire, forming the commune's northern border.

Saint-Florent-le-Viel is located on the La Loire à vélo, itself a subset of the EuroVelo6, the trans-European bicycle route.

See also
Communes of the Maine-et-Loire department

References

Saintflorentlevieil
Anjou